Panoramic Hill is a residential neighborhood of the cities of Berkeley and Oakland, California defined by the homes along and within the access corridor defined by Panoramic Way.

Geography
The Panoramic Hill Neighborhood is located at the eastern edge of the city of Berkeley, southeast of the University of California campus, and situated at the northwestern foot of the Claremont Canyon Regional Preserve and the Claremont Hills.  The neighborhood is bounded by Piedmont Avenue, the Clark Kerr Campus and the main University of California campus. The eastern half of this neighborhood is in the City of Oakland.  It includes the streets of Panoramic Way, Mosswood Road, Panoramic Place (Berkeley), Panoramic Place (Oakland), Arden Road, Dwight Place, and Dwight Way.  The neighborhood is approximately 0.258 square miles.

Traffic
Panoramic Way is a very steep and narrow public road with numerous sharp turns and curves serving approximately 500 residents.  Traffic can become difficult during rush hours, waste collection times or when construction and service vehicles are present.  Emergency vehicles do regular patrols of the area to test their ability to access all residents in case of emergency.   The speed limit is limited to 15 mph.  Where the street is only wide enough for one car, the car facing downhill must yield to the car facing uphill, as required by California Motor Vehicle Code.

Parking
Because of the Panoramic Hill Neighborhood's situation between both the city of Berkeley and the city of Oakland it is regulated by both cities with parking regulation.  The Berkeley portion of the hill has a 2-hour limit and is patrolled between 8 AM and 7 PM, Monday through Saturday, excluding holidays.  Residents can acquire a "K" parking permit.  Parking in the Oakland portion of the hill is also limited to 2 hours and is patrolled between 8 AM and 6 PM, Monday through Friday.  Residents can acquire an "L" parking permit.

The City of Oakland does not patrol this area with any regularity. Additionally, the Oakland part of Panoramic Hill is in the same high fire danger zone as the City of Berkeley, yet Oakland does not demonstrate active interest in maintaining reasonable ingress/egress by sweeping the road or by scraping the road when it is impacted by soil sliding downhill into the road.

Panoramic Walking Path

Panoramic Hill is home to a series of maintained walking paths and staircases that lead, on and off the road, halfway up the hill where they intersect a series of fire trails that lead into the hills.  Each set of steps is treated as its own walking byway and is therefore named and well marked.  Signs are also placed around the hill indicating the direction of the closest set of 'steps off the hill' for visitors who become lost among the trees, architecture, and windy roads.  The lower steps are called Orchard Lane, and split at Panoramic Way (the vehicle road) and Mosswood Path a pedestrian pathway covered by antique red woods.  Arden Steps are the penultimate set of steps in the series and are severely steep.  Arden Steps and Arden Path meet at the cul-de-sac of Arden Road where Arden Path finishes the series with a sloping path and a final series up two dozen wooden steps.

A plaque at the entrance to the Orchard Lane and thus the bottom of the hill is inscribed:

History

Established in 1904 by Warren Cheney, the Panoramic Hill neighborhood of Berkeley and Oakland enjoys a robust history.

Panoramic Hill was added to the National Register of Historic Places as a historic district in 2005.

Fire Trail
The upper and lower Jordan trails are fire trails through the University of California ecological area.  The university is required to keep the trails open for emergency vehicle access.

Points of interest
The Berkeley Historical Society frequently conducts walking tours of Panoramic Hill and its surrounding trails and views.

Architecture

Panoramic Hill features the architecture of Julia Morgan, Ernest Coxhead, John Hudson Thomas, Walter Ratcliff, William Wurster, Walter Steilberg, Frank Lloyd Wright, Mark Mack, Harwell Hamilton Harris and Bernard Maybeck as well as a wide variety of craftsman built homes each uniquely adapting to the geography and encapsulating the view.  The Panoramic Hill neighborhood is frequently a part of architectural walking tours in Berkeley. Panoramic Hill was named "Berkeley's Most Romantic Neighborhood" by the Berkeley Architectural Heritage Association.

See also
California Memorial Stadium

References

External links
 Panoramic Hill House Tour 1
 Panoramic Hill House Tour 2
 The Panoramic Hill Association, a fee supported representative group for the neighborhood.
 The Panoramic Hill Advocates , a community supported neighborhood forum.

Neighborhoods in Berkeley, California
Neighborhoods in Oakland, California
Populated places established in 1904
National Register of Historic Places in Berkeley, California
Historic districts on the National Register of Historic Places in California
National Register of Historic Places in Oakland, California